Events in the year 1900 in Iceland.

Incumbents 

 Monarch: Christian IX
 Minister for Iceland: Hugo Egmont Hørring (until 27 April); August Hermann Ferdinand Carl Goos onwards

Events 

 27 April – August Hermann Ferdinand Carl Goos is appointed Minister for Iceland.
 29 June – The Home Rule Party is established.

References 

 
1900s in Iceland
Years of the 20th century in Iceland
Iceland
Iceland